A necklace is an article of jewelry worn around the neck.

Necklace may also refer to:

 Necklace (combinatorics) or fixed necklace, a concept in combinatorial mathematics
 "The Necklace", a short story by Guy de Maupassant
 "The Necklace (Dynasty)", a 1981 episode of the TV series Dynasty
 Necklace (horse)

See also
 Necklace of Harmonia, a fabled object in Greek mythology
 Necklace splitting problem, another application in combinatorics
 The Affair of the Necklace (disambiguation)
 Antoine's necklace, in topology
 Necklacing, a form of execution
 Necklace Nebula, nebula located in the constellation Sagitta